Hilgert is an Ortsgemeinde in the Westerwaldkreis in Rhineland-Palatinate, Germany.

Hilgert may also refer to:
 Ivan Hilgert, former Czechoslovak slalom canoeist
 Luboš Hilgert (disambiguation), several people
 Markus Hilgert (born 1969), German Assyriologist

See also
 Ovambo sparrowhawk, AKA Hilgert's sparrowhawk